Alper Kalemci (born 22 July 1991) is a Turkish footballer who last played as a midfielder for Anadolu Selçukspor. He made his Süper Lig debut on 6 April 2013.

References

External links
 Alper Kalemci at TFF.org

1991 births
Living people
Sportspeople from Muğla
Turkish footballers
Turkey youth international footballers
Elazığspor footballers
Süper Lig players
Association football midfielders